Locharna is a genus of tussock moths in the family Erebidae. The genus was erected by Frederic Moore in 1879.

Species
Locharna epiperca Collenette, 1947
Locharna flavopicta (Chao, 1985)
Locharna limbata (Collenette, 1932)
Locharna pica (Chao, 1985)
Locharna strigipennis Moore, 1879

References

Lymantriinae
Moth genera